Edwin Evans may refer to:

Edwin Evans (cricketer) (1849–1921), Australian cricketer
Edwin Evans (artist) (1860–1946), American painter from Utah
Edwin Evans (politician) (1855–1928), British politician
Edwin Evans (composer) (1844–1923), composer and organist
Edwin Evans (music critic) (1874–1945), English music critic (son of preceding)